Novomusino (Yañı Musa) is a rural locality (a village) in Karmaskalinsky District, Bashkortostan, Russia. The population was 4 as of 2010.

References 

Rural localities in Karmaskalinsky District